Duquesne Baseball Field is a baseball field located in Pittsburgh, Pennsylvania, United States, in the borough of Green Tree.  The field was home to the Duquesne Dukes baseball team, which used to compete in the Division I Atlantic 10 Conference.  However, the baseball program was discontinued due to budget cuts after the 2010 season.  The facility was opened for the 1996 season after construction was completed in fall 1995.  Along with the field, the facility features batting cages and permanent seating behind home plate.

References

College baseball venues in the United States
Sports venues in Pennsylvania
Duquesne Dukes baseball